Defending champion Shingo Kunieda defeated Michaël Jérémiasz in the final, 6–1, 6–4 to win the men's singles wheelchair tennis title at the 2008 Australian Open. It was his second Australian Open singles title and fourth major singles title overall.

Seeds

  Shingo Kunieda (champion)
  Robin Ammerlaan (semifinals)

Draw

Finals

Section 1

Section 2

Wheelchair Men's Singles
2008 Men's Singles